Walking fern may refer to two species of fern in the genus Asplenium which are occasionally placed in a separate genus Camptosorus.  The name "walking fern" derives from the fact that new plantlets grow wherever the arching leaves of the parent touch the ground, creating a walking effect.  Both have evergreen, undivided, slightly leathery leaves which are triangular and taper to a thin point.  On the bottom of the leaves, sori, or spore-bearing structures, cluster along the veins.  These hardy plants can be found in shady spots of limestone ledges and limy forest places.

Asplenium rhizophyllum (syn: Camptosorus rhizophyllum), native to North America
Asplenium ruprechtii (syn: Camptosorus sibiricus), native to East Asia

It may also refer to:
Adiantum caudatum, a species of maidenhair fern

References
"walking fern." Encyclopædia Britannica. . Encyclopædia Britannica Online.     <http://www.britannica.com/eb/article-9075948>.

Ferns